"Together Now" is a collaboration between French composer/producer Jean Michel Jarre and Japanese composer/producer Tetsuya Komuro. It was the France 1998 FIFA World Cup theme song. Olivia Lufkin was the vocalist and the lyricist for this song. "Together Now" also features as track 15 of Music of the World Cup: Allez! Ola! Ole!. However, the single was only retailed in Japan. Surprisingly, despite both Lufkin and Tetsuya Komuro being under Avex, the single itself was released under SMEJ. The single reached number 32 on the Oricon charts and charted for 10 weeks.

Track listing
 Together Now (Original Full Mix) 
 Together Now (Parlez Vous Francais Mix)
 Together Now (Radio Edit (Breakdown Mix)) 
 Oxygene 13 (TK Remix) (Jean Michel Jarre) 
 Together Now (Instrumental)

References 

1998 singles
Olivia Lufkin songs
Songs written by Tetsuya Komuro
FIFA World Cup songs
Sony Music Entertainment Japan singles